Penelomax is a genus of spiny crawler mayflies in the family Ephemerellidae. There is one described species in Penelomax, P. septentrionalis.

References

Further reading

 
 
 

Mayflies
Articles created by Qbugbot